Edouard Etifier (born 1936) better known as Eddie Morrow, is a retired Martinican professional wrestler.

He is the brother of Gerard Etifier (aka Gerry/Jerry Morrow).

He wrestled as Jack Claybourne (Junior) in Australia and New Zealand. A reference to the African American wrestler of the 1930s-1960, Jack Claybourne.

Championships and accomplishments 
50th State Big Time Wrestling
NWA North American Heavyweight Championship (Hawaii version) (1 time)
All Star Pro Wrestling
NWA British Empire/Commonwealth Championship (New Zealand version) (1 time)
NWA All-Star Wrestling
NWA Canadian Tag Team Championship (Vancouver version) (1 time) - with Gerry Morrow
Stampede Wrestling
Stampede International Tag Team Championship (4 times) - with Gerry Morrow (3 times) and Gama Singh (1 time) 
Stampede North American Heavyweight Championship (1 time)

References

External links
 
 Online World Of Wrestling - Eddie Morrow
 Cagematch - Eddie Morrow

1936 births
Living people
Stampede Wrestling alumni
20th-century professional wrestlers
Stampede Wrestling International Tag Team Champions
Stampede Wrestling North American Heavyweight Champions